Child's Pose may refer to:

Bālāsana, a yoga posture
Child's Pose (film), a 2013 Romanian drama film